The Orange Award for New Writers was a prize given by telecommunications company Orange between 2006 and 2010. It was launched to commemorate the tenth anniversary of the Orange Prize for Fiction.  The award was supported by Arts Council England and was accompanied by a bursary of £10,000.  It was open to any female authors who had written their debut novel in the English language.

Winners and shortlisted nominees

References

First book awards
Awards established in 2006
2006 establishments in the United Kingdom
Awards disestablished in 2010
2010 disestablishments in the United Kingdom